The Rolls-Royce Heritage Trust is an organisation that was founded in 1981 to preserve the history of Rolls-Royce Limited, Rolls-Royce Holdings and all merged or acquired companies. Five volunteer led branches exist, three in England, one in Scotland and a North American branch.

Branches

Derby and Hucknall

The collection is located within the Company campus at Sinfin. The site at Osmaston Road is now permanently closed.

A separate site with a smaller engine collection details the history of the Rolls-Royce Flight Test Establishment at Hucknall.

Coventry and Ansty

The Coventry and Ansty branch examples of Armstrong Siddeley rocket designs is kept at the Derby site.

Bristol
The Bristol branch engine collection is housed in the Sir Roy Fedden Heritage Centre. As well as Roy Fedden designed engines from the Bristol Aeroplane Company and products built by Bristol Siddeley a number of de Havilland and Blackburn types are displayed.

Scotland
The Scottish branch of the Rolls-Royce Heritage Trust is based in the village of Inchinnan, Renfrewshire and has a collection of engines that were produced at the Hillington and East Kilbride factories.

Indianapolis
The Indianapolis branch of the trust chronicles the history of the Allison Engine Company which was acquired by Rolls-Royce in 1995 as well as later and current products of Rolls-Royce North America.

Publications
The Rolls-Royce Heritage Trust publishes a range of books and other media specialising in aero engine subjects and other products, company personnel and history topics.

Twice a year, members receive a publication - The Journal.

See also

References
Notes

Further reading
 Donne, Michael. Leader of the skies - Rolls-Royce: The first seventy-five years. London, England. Frederick Muller Limited, 1981.   
 Pugh, Peter. The Magic of a Name - The Rolls-Royce Story - The First 40 Years. Cambridge, England. Icon Books Ltd, 2000.  
 Pugh, Peter. The Magic of a Name - The Rolls-Royce Story - Part Two:The Power Behind the Jets. Cambridge, England. Icon Books Ltd, 2001.  
 Pugh, Peter. The Magic of a Name - The Rolls-Royce Story - Part Three:A family of Engines. Cambridge, England. Icon Books Ltd, 2002.

External links

Hucknall Flight Test Museum
Rolls-Royce Heritage Trust
Rolls-Royce
Rolls-Royce Motor Cars

Aerospace museums in England
Aerospace museums in Scotland
Aerospace museums in Indiana
Rolls-Royce
Museums established in 1981